Nada Es Color De Rosa (Nothing's colored pink;Nothing's easy) is the fourth solo studio album by Mexican artist, Yuridia.

Album development
After a 2-year recording hiatus, Yurida returned to the studio to record this album. Most of the songs were composed by Julio Ramirez Eguia, member of Mexican band, Reik., Ettore Grenci, and Fernando Pantini. The album was recorded and mixed at Sonic Ranch Studios, El Paso (TX) and Hensons Studios, Los Angeles (CA).
Nada Es Color De Rosa was produced by Ettore Grenci and engineered / mixed by Fabrizio Simoncioni.

Promotion
As the release of the album neared, Yuridia went on a promotional tour which took her to cities within the Mexican region, as well as the United States. She also appeared on Spanish-speaking television shows, more noticeably, the show that helped launch her career, La Academia. The producer, Ettore Grenci, composed most of the songs, hand in hand with the singer, who is also the author of two songs on the album, "Un Paso Más" and "Todas Las Noches", a duet with the Italian group Sonohra. This album has sold 120,000 copies worldwide and has been certified Platinum + Gold. The first single, Irremediable, was the #5 Top Song in Mexico. The second single, Me Olvidarás, topped the Top 10 songs, peaking at #9. Contigo, the third single, was on the Top Monitor Latino, peaking at #12. Yuridia released No Me Preguntes Más as her fourth single, which has peaked at the Top Monitor Latino at #2.

Chart performance
The album debuted at No. 91 on the AMPROFON chart, and then went on to move up to peak at No. 1. A month after its release, Nada Es Color De Rosa received Gold for 45,000 copies. The album was certified Platinum for selling over 80,000 copies. Its last certification has been Platinum + Gold for 120,000 copies.

Singles

 "Irremediable"

July 29, 2009 Mex, 
August 10, 2010 USA

 "Me Olvidaras"

January 10, 2010

 "Contigo"

June 10, 2010

 "No Me Preguntes Más"

October 19, 2010

Track listing

Source:

Certifications

Release history

References

2009 albums
Yuridia albums
Albums recorded at Sonic Ranch